The Arrowsmith River lies within the Mid West region of Western Australia.

The explorer George Grey found the river on 11 April 1839, on his second expedition along the west coast. He named it after the distinguished English cartographer John Arrowsmith.

Flooding in surrounding areas occurred in 1932 following a torrential downpour that caused the river and surrounding creeks to rise and flood a few hours later.

The salinity levels in the river are often higher than 1000 mg/L due to brackish run-off water, but the potential bore yields of the catchment are quite high.

References 

Rivers of the Mid West region